Nacogdoches County is a county located in the U.S. state of Texas. As of the 2010 census, its population was 64,653. Its county seat is Nacogdoches.

The Nacogdoches, Texas micropolitan statistical area includes all of Nacogdoches County.

Nacogdoches hosts the Blueberry Festival in June. The county is the top blueberry producer in Texas and is headquarters for the Texas Blueberry Marketing Association. It tagged itself as the "Capital of the Texas Forest Country".

History
The county was created in 1826 as a municipality of Mexico and organized as a county in 1837.

Geography

Adjacent counties
 Rusk County (north)
 Shelby County (northeast)
 San Augustine County (southeast)
 Angelina County (south)
 Cherokee County (west)

National protected area
 Angelina National Forest (part)

Demographics

Note: the US Census treats Hispanic/Latino as an ethnic category. This table excludes Latinos from the racial categories and assigns them to a separate category. Hispanics/Latinos can be of any race.

As of the census of 2000,  59,203 people, 22,006 households, and 14,039 families resided in the county.  The population density was 62 people per square mile (24/km2).  The 25,051 housing units had an average density of 26 per square mile (10/km2).  The racial makeup of the county was 75.00% White], 16.74% African American, 0.39% Native American, 0.70% Asian, 0.07% Pacific Islander, 5.70% from other races, and 1.41% from two or more races.  About 11.25% of the population were Hispanics or Latinos of any race.

Of the 22,006 households, 30.5% had children under 18 living with them, 48.3% were married couples living together, 11.8% had a female householder with no husband present, and 36.2% were not families. About 27.6% of all households were made up of individuals, and 9.3% had someone living alone who was 65 or older.  The average household size was 2.49, and the average family size was 3.08.

In the county, the age distribution was 24.0% under the age of 18, 20.0% from 18 to 24, 24.7% from 25 to 44, 19.2% from 45 to 64, and 12.1% who were 65 or older.  The median age was 30 years. For every 100 females, there were 93.00 males.  For every 100 females 18 and over, there were 89.00 males.

The median income for a household in the county was $28,301, and for a family was $38,347. Males had a median income of $29,502 versus $21,422 for females. The per capita income for the county was $15,437.  About 15.50% of families and 23.30% of the population were below the poverty line, including 27.10% of those under 18 and 13.90% of those 65 or over.

Transportation

Bus
Greyhound Lines operates the Nacogdoches Station at the Kerrville Bus Company station in Nacogdoches.

Major highways
  U.S. Highway 59
  Interstate 69 is currently under construction and will follow the current route of U.S. 59 in most places.
  U.S. Highway 259
  State Highway 7
  State Highway 21
  State Highway 103
  State Highway 204
  Farm to Market Road 95
  Farm to Market Road 225
  Farm to Market Road 226

Communities

Cities 
 Appleby
 Chireno
 Cushing
 Garrison
 Nacogdoches (county seat and largest municipality)

Census-designated place 
 Redfield

Unincorporated communities 
 Douglass
 Etoile
 Looneyville
 Martinsville
 Sacul
 Trawick
 Woden

Education
School districts:
 Central Heights Independent School District
 Chireno Independent School District
 Cushing Independent School District
 Douglass Independent School District
 Garrison Independent School District
 Martinsville Independent School District
 Nacogdoches Independent School District
 Woden Independent School District

The county is in the district for Angelina College.

Etoile Independent School District, which formerly served parts of the county, merged into Woden ISD in 2022.

Notable residents
 Clint Dempsey, professional soccer player
 John H. Hannah Jr. - U.S. District Court judge
 Ron Raines, actor

Politics

See also

 Millard's Crossing Historic Village
 Old Stone Fort Museum
 Sterne-Hoya House Museum and Library
 List of museums in East Texas
 National Register of Historic Places listings in Nacogdoches County, Texas
 Recorded Texas Historic Landmarks in Nacogdoches County

References

Further reading
 Roth, Jeffery, and J. B. Watson Jr., “African-American Education in Nacogdoches County, 1890–1970,” East Texas Historical Journal, 51 (Spring 2013), 9–23

External links

 Nacogdoches County government's website
 Nacogdoches County Chamber of Commerce website
 
 Interactive Community website
 Texas Blueberry Festival website

 
Texas placenames of Native American origin
1837 establishments in the Republic of Texas
Populated places established in 1837